Hanna High School may refer to:

Hanna High School (Oklahoma) in Hanna, Oklahoma, USA
Archbishop Hanna High School in Sonoma, California, USA
Homer Hanna High School in Brownsville, Texas, USA
T. L. Hanna High School in Anderson, South Carolina, USA

See also
Pardes Hanna Agricultural High School in Pardes Hanna-Karkur, Israel